An Educational Service District, or ESD, is a regional education unit in the U.S. state of Washington. Organizationally different from a school district, a single ESD in Washington serves dozens of school districts. ESDs are established to allow school districts to work, plan, and buy equipment collectively. In Washington they also provide other intermediary services between the Office of Superintendent of Public Instruction and local school districts.

Legislative role 
There are nine statutory regional service agencies in Washington. Created by the legislature more than 40 years ago, the expressed purpose of an ESD is to assure equal educational opportunities for quality education and lifelong learning for all. In addition to acting as a liaison between local districts and the State Office of the Superintendent of Public Instruction to deliver programs mandated by the state, Washington's ESDs are public entities, which operate in a highly entrepreneurial fashion.

In 1967 the ESD entities in Washington state cooperated to create the Washington School Information Processing Cooperative, also called WSIPC.

Scope of service 
ESDs was first created as a system of county school offices overseeing the establishment and operation of local school districts for the state. Eventually that system developed into large media distribution centers, also serving as financial advisers for schools. Now, ESDs are both regional service providers and brokers among schools, businesses and governments for a variety of school administrative functions and children's education, health and social services.  An ESD's scope includes but is not limited to: curriculum, instructional support and assessment, business operations, transportation, youth employment, printing, public relations, data processing, payroll, fingerprinting, network support, statewide computer networks, traffic safety education, construction management, preschool programs, homeless transportation, para-educator training, and special education.

List of ESDs 
Washington state has nine ESDs that oversee 295 school districts.

 ESD 101 (Northeast ESD) in Spokane
 ESD 105 in Yakima
 ESD 112 in Vancouver
 ESD 113 in Tumwater
 ESD 114 (Olympic ESD) in Bremerton
 ESD 121 (Puget Sound ESD) in Renton
 ESD 123 in Pasco
 ESD 171 (North Central ESD) in Wenatchee
 ESD 189 (Northwest ESD) in Anacortes

See also
 List of school districts in Washington
 Washington State Office of Superintendent of Public Instruction

References

External links
 Washington State ESDs
 Overlay maps of ESDs, districts, and counties

Public education in Washington (state)
Washington
Special districts of Washington (state)